488th may refer to:

488th Bombardment Group, an inactive United States Air Force unit
488th Bombardment Squadron, an inactive United States Air Force unit

See also
488 (number)
488 (disambiguation)
488, the year 488 (CDLXXXVIII) of the Julian calendar
488 BC